Mechanic Alludu is a 1993 Telugu-language action comedy film directed by B. Gopal. It stars Akkineni Nageswara Rao, Chiranjeevi, Vijayashanti with music composed by Raj–Koti. The film was produced by Allu Aravind under the Geetha Arts banner.

Plot
Jagannatham a multi-millionaire performs his sister Parvati espousal with his friend Narayana a malicious. So, he ploys along with his associate Kotappa, indicts Jagannatham in a murder case when they even intimidate Parvati to give a fake statement against her brother which leads to his sentence. Thereafter, they also seek to kill pregnant Parvati when she is rescued wise lady Mahalakshmi. Later on, she leaves the city after giving birth to a baby boy Ravi. Years roll by, Ravi a young and energetic guy, always bickers at every workplace and loses his jobs. Parallelly, he squabbles with a lady bully Chitti daughter of Jagannatham who runs a hotel in his area and she too does the same. At present, Jagannatham lives as a mechanic, once Ravi saves him from a dancer and joins as employ in his shed. After a few funny incidents Ravi and Chitti fall in love and Jagannatham also gives approval for their wedding. During the time of their engagement, furious Jagannatham rejects the match knowing Ravi as his nephew. But afterward, realizing the actuality when Jagannatham and Ravi decide to take avenge against Narayana, so, they enter into his house and start confusing him with their relationships. Right now, Narayana has performed a second marriage with Mahalakshmi, after learning the truth she also conjoins with them. After a comic tale, they teach a lesson to Narayana and everybody gets united. Finally, the movie ends on a happy note with the marriage of Ravi and Chitti.

Cast

 Akkineni Nageswara Rao as Jagannatham
 Chiranjeevi as Ravi
 Vijayashanti as Chitti 
 Satyanarayana as Narayana
 Kota Srinivasa Rao as Kotappa
 Brahmanandam as Babji
 Sudhakar as Raja 
 Ali
 Mohan Raj 
 Ponnambalam
 Prasad Babu
 Sharada as Mahalakshmi
 Shubha as Parvathi
 Jayalalita as Pankajam
 Hema
 Disco Shanthi as item number
 Thalapathy Dinesh

Soundtrack

Music composed by Raj–Koti. Music released on Lahari Music Company.

References

External links
 

1990s Telugu-language films
1993 films
Films directed by B. Gopal
Films scored by Raj–Koti
Geetha Arts films